Bright Surroundings Dark Beginnings is a live performance album by American experimental rock band Sun City Girls, released in 1993 by Majora Records.

Track listing

Personnel
Adapted from the Bright Surroundings Dark Beginnings liner notes.

Sun City Girls
 Alan Bishop – bass guitar
 Richard Bishop – guitar
 Charles Gocher – drums, percussion

Production and additional personnel
 Wade Olson – recording
 Sun City Girls – recording

Release history

References

External links 
 

1993 live albums
Sun City Girls albums